Phase Echo was an operation in Gulf War I in 1991 to withdraw all of the American troops from Iraq as quickly and safely as possible.

Phase Echo